Torsten Ottersen Hoff (c.1688 – 1754) was a Norwegian sculptor. In addition to commissions in his home town, he did work in several other places in eastern and southern Norway. He also made furnace models for the ironworks.

He is known for decorations of the Oslo Cathedral, and is regarded to have decorated interior of Sørum Church, and churches in Løken, Vestby, Holt and Ås. He also designed oven plates for several ironworks.

References

Year of birth unknown
1754 deaths
Norwegian sculptors
Year of birth uncertain